Robert S. Grant was a Scottish amateur football wing half who made over 220 appearances in the Scottish League for Queen's Park. He represented Scotland at amateur level.

References

Year of birth missing
Scottish footballers
Scottish Football League players
Queen's Park F.C. players
Place of death missing
Date of death missing
Association football wing halves
Scotland amateur international footballers
Footballers from Glasgow